Acacia divergens is a shrub belonging to the genus Acacia and the subgenus Phyllodineae that is native to Western Australia.

The branchlets are usually glabrous or slightly haired and finely yellow-ribbed with  slender stipules. It blooms from August to November and produces cream-yellow flowers. It has one simple inflorescences per axil. The flower heads have a globular shape containing 5 to 10 cream to yellow flowers.

A. divergens is part of the A. biflora group and also resembles A. robiniae.

It is found in an area in the southern Wheatbelt, Peel, South West and Great Southern regions of Western Australia that is most often found along watercourses, around swamps and other damp areas although it also is found in drier areas such as loamy laterite in Jarrah forest as well as in coastal heath communities.

See also
 List of Acacia species

References

divergens
Acacias of Western Australia
Plants described in 1842
Taxa named by George Bentham